The Weightlifting competitions at the 2021 Southeast Asian Games took place at Hanoi Sports Training and Competition Centre in Hanoi, Vietnam. It took place from 13 to 15 May 2022.
The 2021 Games featured 14 events.

Results

Men's 55 kg

Men's 61 kg

Men's 67 kg

Men's 73 kg

Men's 81 kg

Men's 89 kg

Men's +89 kg

Women's 45 kg

Women's 49 kg

Women's 55 kg

Women's 59 kg

Women's 64 kg

Women's 71 kg

Women's +71 kg

References

External links
  

2021 Southeast Asian Games events
2021